Fritz Neumeyer (born 1946 in Germany) is an architectural theoretician and a professor emeritus.

Neumeyer held the chair and professorship for Theory of Architecture at the Technische Universität Berlin. Among other academic appointments, Neumeyer taught at Princeton University and Leuven University. Neumeyer is considered the foremost scholar on the modernist architect Ludwig Mies van der Rohe. Neumeyer's most famous book is titled "The Artless Word. Mies van der Rohe on the Building Art", originally published in German in 1986.

References

20th-century German architects
1946 births
Living people
21st-century German architects